Tommaso del Garbo or Thomas de Garbo (c.1305, in Florence – 1370, in Florence) was a professor of medicine in Perugia and Bologna. He was the son of the physician Dino del Garbo and a friend of the poet Petrarch. It is said that the physician Pietro da Tossignano studied under Garbo at the University of Bologna.

Bibliography
Consilio di Tommaso del Garbo Fiorentino contro la Pestilentia, in: M. Ficino, Contra alla peste, Firenze, 1576

References

External links

Physicians from Florence
14th-century Italian physicians
1305 births
1370 deaths